Christian Juhl (born 24 February 1953 in Hejls) is a Danish politician, who is a member of the Folketing for the Red-Green Alliance political party. He was elected into parliament at the 2011 Danish general election.

Political career
Juhl was elected into parliament in the 2011 election, where he received 1,566 votes. He was reelected in 2015 with 1,648 votes and in 2019 with 1,178 votes.

Juhl is also a member of the People's Movement against the EU, and ran in the European Parliament elections for the party in 2009, 2014 and 2019, though did not get elected.

References

External links 
 Biography on the website of the Danish Parliament (Folketinget)

Living people
1953 births
People from Kolding Municipality
Red–Green Alliance (Denmark) politicians
Members of the Folketing 2011–2015
Members of the Folketing 2015–2019
Members of the Folketing 2019–2022